Davaagiin Enkhee (born 29 July 1964) is a Mongolian cross-country skier. She competed at the 1988 Winter Olympics and the 2002 Winter Olympics.

References

External links
 

1964 births
Living people
Mongolian female cross-country skiers
Olympic cross-country skiers of Mongolia
Cross-country skiers at the 1988 Winter Olympics
Cross-country skiers at the 2002 Winter Olympics
People from Uvs Province
20th-century Mongolian women